The Mughal conquest of Malwa was a military campaign launched by the Mughal Empire in 1560 during the reign of Akbar (r. 1556–1605) against the Sultanate of Malwa, which had broken free from Mughal rule during the rebellion of Sher Shah Suri from the emperor Humayun. Thus, Akbar had a claim to the province. Baz Bahadur had been the governor of Malwa in the Sur Empire but broke away after the death of Sher Shah.

The conquest was led by Akbar's foster brother Adham Khan and the general Pir Muhammad Khan. They defeated Baz Bahadur at the Battle of Sarangpur in 1561, when his Afghan forces deserted him. The Mughals occupied the capital Mandu, perpetrating massacres on the populace, according to the historian Badauni, and appropriating the wealth and harem of the Sultan. Akbar himself intervened, riding to Malwa and removing Adham Khan from governorship of the province, seizing his spoils. He sent Pir Muhammad Khan south to give chase to Baz Bahadur. Adham Khan is said to have desired the Sultan of Malwa's wife Roopmati, who committed suicide by consuming poison rather than be taken by the Mughal military commander.

After the conquest, Baz Bahadur fled Malwa to Khandesh, and was there pursued by Mughal military commander Pir Muhammad Khan who occupied Burhanpur, the capital of the area. However, Khan was defeated and killed by a coalition of Baz Bahadur, Khandesh Sultanate, and Berar Sultanate, leading to Baz Bahadur regaining Malwa for a brief period in 1562 before renewed Mughal attacks.

Akbar sent Abdullah Khan Uzbeg to recover Malwa. Baz Bahadur again escaped, first to the hills of Gondwara to conduct guerilla warfare, then seeking shelter with Udai Singh II in 1568. Meanwhile, Abdullah Khan became governor of Malwa. Baz Bahadur finally surrendered to the Mughals in 1570 and was awarded a mansabdari of 2,000 by Akbar, becoming a part of the Mughal nobility. The conquered areas were later organized into the Malwa Subah.

Additional images

References

Wars involving the Mughal Empire
Military history of India
16th-century conflicts
1560s in India
1560s in the Mughal Empire
Malwa